DXAV-TV, is a commercial television station of Philippine television network GTV, owned by Citynet Network Marketing and Productions, a subsidiary of GMA Network Inc. Its transmitter facility are located at Linabo Peak, Lugdungan, Dipolog.

See also
GTV
List of GTV stations

GTV (Philippine TV network) stations
Television stations in Zamboanga del Norte
Television channels and stations established in 1995